Neolamprologus sexfasciatus is a species of cichlid fish that is endemic to the southern half of Lake Tanganyika in East Africa.  It can reach a length of  TL.  This species can also be found in the aquarium trade. It mainly eats snails, and its pharyngeal bones and teeth are adapted to this hard-shelled prey.

An aggressive mimic of this species is Plecodus straeleni, a scale-eating cichlid that is able to approach its victims by resembling a harmless species.

References

sexfasciatus
Taxa named by Max Poll
Taxa named by Ethelwynn Trewavas
Fish described in 1952
Taxonomy articles created by Polbot